Lawrence William "Lawrie" Peckham (born 4 December 1944) is a retired Australian high jumper. A ten-time national champion, he won two gold and one silver medal at the Commonwealth Games in 1966–1974. He competed at the 1968, 1972 and 1976 Olympics and placed 10th, 8th and 18th, respectively. In 1977, Peckham married fellow Olympian, Judy Canty, the 1978 Commonwealth Games champion in the 800 metres. In retirement he worked as a physical education coach.

International competitions

See also
 Australian athletics champions

References 

1944 births
Living people
Athletes from Melbourne
Australian male high jumpers
Olympic athletes of Australia
Athletes (track and field) at the 1964 Summer Olympics
Athletes (track and field) at the 1968 Summer Olympics
Athletes (track and field) at the 1972 Summer Olympics
Commonwealth Games gold medallists for Australia
Commonwealth Games bronze medallists for Australia
Commonwealth Games medallists in athletics
Athletes (track and field) at the 1962 British Empire and Commonwealth Games
Athletes (track and field) at the 1966 British Empire and Commonwealth Games
Athletes (track and field) at the 1970 British Commonwealth Games
Athletes (track and field) at the 1974 British Commonwealth Games
Sportsmen from Victoria (Australia)
Australian athletics coaches
Medallists at the 1966 British Empire and Commonwealth Games
Medallists at the 1970 British Commonwealth Games
Medallists at the 1974 British Commonwealth Games